The Annie Award for Character Animation in an Animated Feature Production is an Annie Award awarded annually to the best character animator and introduced in 1995. It rewards animation of characters for animated feature films.

Up until the creation of both the Annie Award for Character Animation in a TV Production and Live Action Production categories, live-action films, TV series, animated shorts, and non-theatrical releases were eligible for nomination in this category.

Winners and nominees 
‡= special award*= non-feature nominee†=live-action nominee

1990s 
Best Individual Achievement for Artistic Excellence in the Field of Animation

Best Individual Achievement for Animation

Best Individual Achievement for Character Animation

2000s

2010s

2020s

References

External links 
 Annie Awards: Legacy

Annie Awards